The Kerrang! Awards 2008 were held in London, England, on 21 August 2008 at The Brewery in Romford and were hosted by Anthrax guitarist Scott Ian.

On 22 July 2008 Kerrang! announced the 2008 nominees. The main categories were dominated by Thirty Seconds to Mars and Bullet for My Valentine with four nominations, followed by Avenged Sevenfold with three. Thirty Seconds to Mars was the biggest winner of the night, taking home two awards.

Nominations
Winners are in bold text.

Best British Newcomer
Dead Swans
We Are the Ocean
Slaves to Gravity
Elliot Minor
Go:Audio

Best International Newcomer
Kill Hannah
A Day to Remember
Four Year Strong
Black Tide
All Time Low

Best British Band
Lostprophets
Bring Me the Horizon
You Me at Six
Bullet for My Valentine
Biffy Clyro

Best International Band
Thirty Seconds to Mars
My Chemical Romance
Madina Lake
Coheed and Cambria
Avenged Sevenfold

Best Live Band
Thirty Seconds to Mars
Lostprophets
Machine Head
The Dillinger Escape Plan
Avenged Sevenfold

Best Album
Bullet for My Valentine — Scream Aim Fire
Avenged Sevenfold — Avenged Sevenfold
In Flames — A Sense of Purpose
Mindless Self Indulgence — If
Cancer Bats — Hail Destroyer

Best Single
Thirty Seconds to Mars — "From Yesterday"
Bullet for My Valentine — "Waking the Demon"
Simple Plan — "Your Love Is a Lie"
Kids in Glass Houses — "Give Me What I Want"
Pendulum — "Propane Nightmares"

Best Video
Thirty Seconds to Mars — "A Beautiful Lie"
Bullet for My Valentine — "Waking the Demon"
Weezer — "Pork and Beans"
Coheed and Cambria — "Feathers"
Gallows — "Staring at the Rude Bois"

Classic Songwriter
Def Leppard

Kerrang! Inspiration
Metallica

Kerrang! Icon
Slipknot

Kerrang! Hall of Fame
Rage Against the Machine

Spirit of Independence
The Dillinger Escape Plan

References

External links
Kerrang! Awards official website

2008
2008 music awards
2008 in London
Culture in London
2008 in British music